Saint-Aubert is a commune in the Nord department in northern France.

History
Private A S Bullock in his World War I memoir recalls spending a night on the brick floor of an abandoned house in St Aubert on 24 October 1918, waking at 5 am to heavy artillery bombardment. He provides a dramatic description of the battle that ensued, with horses carrying guns into battle and men stripped to the waist 'working like demons loading the guns'. He recalled, 'the shells were falling so thick and at such speed that the flash of their bursting seemed to cover the hill with a sheet of fire. It was incredible that anything could survive there.'

Heraldry

See also
Communes of the Nord department

References

Saintaubert